Su Kacha (also Romanized as Sū Kāchā; also known as Sekāchel) is a village in Eslamabad Rural District, Sangar District, Rasht County, Gilan Province, Iran. At the 2006 census, its population was 401, including 112 families.

References 

Populated places in Rasht County